Hope Township is the name of some places in the U.S. state of Michigan:

 Hope Township, Barry County, Michigan
 Hope Township, Midland County, Michigan

See also
Hope Township (disambiguation)

Michigan township disambiguation pages